The 33 Tour was a concert tour performed by Luis Miguel during the years 2003 and 2004 to promote his last album 33. He sang 89 concerts during this tour of a duration about 95 minutes. Luis Miguel performed at Mexico's National Auditorium, as well as other prestigious international venues such as Plaza de Toros de Las Ventas in Spain and José Amalfitani Stadium in Argentina.

During this tour in Spain, the Prince Felipe of Spain presented him with a special award for being the best-selling foreign artist in the country's history, and hosted a special party in his honor in Madrid.

History
To promote 33, Miguel began his 33 Tour on 8 October 2003 in Palm Desert, California. He toured throughout the United States until his final show on 17 November 2003 in Duluth, Georgia. Following his concerts in the United States, he continued the first leg of the tour in South America beginning in Chile on 27 November 2003. He concluded the first leg of his tour on 7 December 2003 in Argentina. Miguel grossed nine million dollars from his concerts in the United States.

Miguel commenced the second leg of his 33 Tour by performing 25 consecutive shows at the National Auditorium in Mexico City from 15 January 2004 to 16 February 2004, breaking the previous record held by his 21 shows during the Amarte Es Un Placer Tour in 2000. Following his performances in Mexico City, he made recitals in the country, singing in Guadalajara, Monterrey, and Tijuana. His concerts at the National Auditorium grossed over $12 million. He returned in the United States where he performed four shows.

The final leg of his 33 Tour was launched on 23 September 2004 where he performed in Spain. Following his shows in Spain, he toured in Central America performing in Guatemala, Costa Rica, El Salvador, and Panama. He then concluded his tour after presenting in Colombia, Ecuador, and Peru. The 33 Tour grossed over $29 million.

This tour finished on October 30, 2004, just 8 days before the worldwide release of his next album, Mexico En La Piel.

Tour Set List

Tour dates

Cancelled shows

Tour Personnel

Band
Vocals: Luis Miguel
Acoustic & electric guitar: Todd Robinson
Bass: Lalo Carrillo
Piano: Francisco Loyo
Keyboards: Arturo Pérez
Drums: Victor Loyo
Percussion: Tommy Aros
Saxophone: Jeff Nathanson
Trumpet: Francisco Abonce
Trombone: Alejandro Carballo
Backing Vocals: Unique & Shanna

Notes

References

External links
Tour list
Concert tracklisting

Luis Miguel concert tours
2003 concert tours
2004 concert tours